The Hyolmo (Tibetic: ཡོལ་མོ་) are a people mainly from the Eastern and Northern Himalayan Regions of Nepal. They refer to themselves as the "hyolmo" or "Yolmopa" and are native residents of the Helambu valleys (situated over 43.4 kilometres/27 miles and 44.1 kilometres/27.4 miles to the north of Kathmandu respectively) and the surrounding regions of Northeastern Nepal. Their combined population in these regions is around 11,000. They also have sizeable communities in Bhutan, Darjeeling, Sikkim and some regions of South-Western Tibet. They are among the 59 indigenous groups officially recognized by the Government of Nepal as having a distinct cultural identity and are also listed as one of the 645 Scheduled Tribes of India.

The Hyolmo people speak the Hyolmo language of the Kyirong–Kagate branch of the Sino-Tibetan language family. Accordingly, it has a high lexical similarity to Tibetan, although the two languages are not completely mutually intelligible.

Etymology 
The term "Yolmo" or "Hyolmo" consists of two separate words — Hyul, which means "a place or area surrounded by high mountains", and Mo, which means "goddess", indicating a place under the protection of a female deity. For centuries, Tibetan Buddhists have referred to the Helambu region using the term "Yolmo". In recent years, most people, Yolmos and otherwise, seem to prefer the name "Helambu" itself. It is also often claimed that the name "Helambu" is derived from the Yolmo words for potatoes and radishes (Hey means "potato" and lahbu means "radish").  This etymology, however, is disputed and often considered spurious. Some refuters of this explanation argue that "Helambu" is an ambiguation of the word "Yolmo" phonetically contoured by the speakers of Nepali.

There is an ongoing discussion amongst Yolmo scholars regarding the spelling of "Yolmo" in the Latin script. Some favour "Yolmo" while others prefer "Hyolmo" or "Yholmo" wherein the presence of the letter "H" indicates that the first syllable of the word is spoken with a low, breathy tone. It is worth noting that Robert R. Desjarlais (except in his most recent work) and Graham E. Clarke (works cited below) both use "Yolmo", while the Nepal Aadivasi Janajati Mahasangh (Nepal Federation of Indigenous Nationalities) uses "Hyolmo".

Culture

Society 
The Hyolmo tribe is organised into several clans, viz. Nyingma-Lama, Shangba, Terngilinpa, Dangsong, Sarma-Lama, Lhalungpa, Lama Dhomare, Chyaba, Chujang,lhoba
 Thongtso, Sharwa all of which follow the patrilineal system of descent. "Bride-stealing" used to be a staple among their customs but it is no longer practiced or encouraged.

Religion 
Their primary religion is Tibetan Buddhism of the Nyingmapa school, intermixed with animism and paganism as incorporated within the general dimensions of Bon.

Language 

The Hyolmo language shares high lexical similarities with Sherpa and Tibetan. It is traditionally transcribed in the Sambhoti (Tibetan) script, but many modern academics use the Devanagari script as well. The Hyolmo language is also very closely related to Kagate, another language of the Kyirong-Kagate language sub-group.

Economy 
Essentially, the Hyolmo people are agriculturalists. Potatoes, radishes, and some other crops constitute their primary sustenance, along with milk and flesh from the yak which the Hyolmo are known to herd. In the last few decades, the Helambu region has also become a popular site for tourism and trekking, and many Hyolmo are now employed in the tourism industry as tour-guides either in their own respective villages or in various other parts of Nepal.

The "Kagate" 
An ethnic group related to the Hyolmo are the Kagate (or Kagatay) who stem from the original hyolmo inhabitants of the Helambu, Melamchi Nimadumbu valleys. What distinguishes them is that the Kagate began migrating southeast from Helambu, and eventually, into the Ramechhap District over 100 years ago, and that they practiced the craft of paper-making during their peregrinations in order to make a living — thereby earning themselves the moniker "Kagate" (which is Nepali for "paper-maker"). They have since developed certain characteristics in their speech that are distinct from traditional Hyolmo. The Yolmo speaking groups in the Lamjung District and Ilam District have also historically been called "Kagate" although both groups claim a clear distinction between themselves and the Kagate of Ramechhap. However, "Hyolmo" and "Kagate" are often used as terms for both the ethnic group and their dialect interchangeably.

Distribution

Nepal 
According to the Nepal National Census of 2011, the population of the Hyolmo people living within Nepal is 10,752, who are distributed over 11 districts of the country, and 99% of this population speak the Hyolmo language. However, the number of monolingual Hyolmo speakers is very low and on a gradual decline, as the number of monolingual Nepali-speaking Hyolmo and bilingual Hyolmo with English as their second language increases. The largest Hyolmo settlements in Nepal (and also internationally) are in the Helambu and Melamchi Valleys which are home to over 10,000 Hyolmo. A separate group of about 700 reside in the Lamjung district while some have settled closer to Pokhara. There are also a number of villages in the Ilam district where Hyolmo is spoken.

India
The Yolmos are listed as a Scheduled Tribe in the states of West Bengal and Sikkim in India.

Bhutan and Tibet 
The Yolmo language is also spoken by significant populations in Bhutan and the Gyirong County of southwestern Tibet.

References

Further reading 

Bishop, Naomi H. (1993). "Circular migration and families: A Hyolmo Sherpa example." South Asia Bulletin 13(1 & 2): 59-66. 
Bishop, Naomi H. (1997). Himalayan herders. Watertown, MA: Documentary Educational Resources. with John Melville Bishop (Writers).
Bishop, Naomi H. (1998). Himalayan herders. Fort Worth; London: Harcourt Brace College Publishers.
Clarke, Graham E. (1980). The temple and kinship amongst a Buddhist people of the Himalaya. University of Oxford, Oxford.   

Clarke, Graham E. (1980). "Lama and Tamang in Yolmo." Tibetan Studies in honor of Hugh Richardson. M. Aris and A. S. S. Kyi (eds). Warminster, Aris and Phillips: 79-86.
Clarke, Graham E. (1983). "The great and little traditions in the study of Yolmo, Nepal." Contributions on Tibetan language, history and culture. E. Steinkellner and H. Tauscher (eds). Vienna, Arbeitskreis fuèr Tibetische und Buddhistische Studien, University of Vienna: 21-37.

Clarke, Graham E. (1991). "Nara (na-rang) in Yolmo: A social history of hell in Helambu." Festschrift fuer Geza Uray. M. T. Much (ed.). Vienna, Arbeitskreis fuer Tibetische und Buddhistische Studien, University of Vienna: 41-62.

Corrias, S. (2004). "Il rito sciamanico Sherpa (Helambu, Nepal)." in G.B. Sychenko et al. (eds) Music and ritual, pp. 228–239. Novosibirsk: NGK. [in Italian]

Desjarlais, Robert (1989). "Sadness, soul loss and healing among the Yolmo Sherpa." Himalaya, the Journal of the Association for Nepal and Himalayan Studies: 9(2): 1-4.

Desjarlais, Robert (1992). Body and emotion : the aesthetics of illness and healing in the Nepal Himalayas. Philadelphia, University of Pennsylvania Press.

Desjarlais, Robert (2003). Sensory biographies: lives and deaths among Nepal's Yolmo Buddhists. Berkeley: University of California Press.

Desjarlais, Robert (2016). Subject to Death: Life and Loss in a Buddhist World. Chicago: University of Chicago Press.
Ehrhard, Franz-Karl (1997). "A "Hidden Land" in the Tibetan-Nepalese Borderlands." In Alexander W. Macdonald (ed.) Mandala and Landscape, pp. 335-364. New Delhi: D.K. Printworld.  
Ehrhard, Franz-Karl (1997). "The lands are like a wiped golden basin": The Sixth Zhva-dmar-pa's Journey to Nepal. In S. Karmay and P. Sagant (eds) Les habitants du Toit du monde, pp. 125–138. Nanterre: Société d’ethnologie. 
Ehrhard, Franz-Karl (2004). "The Story of How bla-ma Karma Chos-bzang Came to Yol-mo": A Family Document from Nepal. In Shoun Hino and Toshihiro Wada (eds) Three Mountains and Seven Rivers, p. 581-600. New Delhi: Motilal Banarsidass Publishers. 
Ehrhard, Franz-Karl (2007). "A Forgotten Incarnation Lineage: The Yol-mo-ba Sprul-skus (16th to 18th Centuries)". In Ramon Prats (ed.) The Pandita and the Siddha: Tibetan Studies in Honour of E. Gene Smith, p. 25-49. Dharamsala: Amnye Machen Institute. 

Gawne, Lauren (2011). Lamjung Yolmo-Nepali-English dictionary. Melbourne, Custom Book Centre; The University of Melbourne.

Gawne, Lauren (2013). Lamjung Yolmo copulas in use: Evidentiality, reported speech and questions. PhD thesis, The University of Melbourne, Melbourne.

Gawne, Lauren (2014). "Similar languages, different dictionaries: A discussion of the Lamjung Yolmo and Kagate dictionary projects." In Ghil'ad Zuckermann, J. Miller & J. Morley (eds.), Endangered Words, Signs of Revival. Adelaide: AustraLex.

Gawne, Lauren (2015). Language documentation and division: Bridging the digital divide. Digital Studies. 
Gawne, Lauren (forthcoming). A sketch grammar of Lamjung Yolmo. Canberra: Asia Pacific Linguistics.

Goldstein, Melvyn C. (1980). "Growing old in Helambu: Aging, migration and family structure among Sherpas." Contributions to Nepalese studies 8(1): 41-56. with Cynthia M. Beall.
Goldstein, Melvyn C. (1983). "High altitude hypoxia, culture, and human fecundity/fertility: A comparative study." American Anthropologist 85(1): 28-49. with Paljor Tsarong & Cynthia M. Beall.
Grierson, George Abraham. (1909/1966). Linguistic survey of India (2d ed.). Delhi: M. Banarsidass. [for mention of Kagate only]
Hári, Anna Mária (2000). Good news, the New Testament in Helambu Sherpa. Kathmandu: Samdan Publishers.
Hári, Anna Mária (2004). Dictionary Yolhmo-Nepali-English. Kathmandu: Central Department of Linguistics, Tribhuvan University. with Chhegu Lama.
Hári, Anna Mária (2010). Yohlmo Sketch Grammar. Kathmandu: Ekta books.
Hedlin, Matthew (2011). An Investigation of the relationship between the Kyirong, Yòlmo, and Standard Spoken Tibetan speech varieties. Masters thesis, Payap University, Chiang Mai.   
Mitchell, Jessica R. and Stephanie R. Eichentopf (2013). Sociolinguistic survey of Kagate: Language vitality and community desires. Kathmandu: Central Department of Linguistics Tribhuvan University, Nepal and SIL International. 
Parkhomenko, N.A. and G.B. Sychenko (2004). "Shyab-ru: Round dance-Songs of the Sherpa-Yolmo of Nepal." in G.B. Sychenko et al. (eds) Music and ritual, pp. 269–285. Novosibirsk: NGK. [in Russian]

Sato, Seika (2007). "I Don't Mind Being Born a Woman the status and agency of women in Yolmo Nepal."Social Dynamics in Northern South Asia, Vol. 1:  Nepalis Inside and Outside Nepal. H. Ishii, D. N. Gellner & K. Nawa (eds). New Delhi: Manohar, 191-222
Sato, Seika (2007). "「私は行かないといった」ネパール・ヨルモ女性の結婚をめぐる語りにみる主体性 ['I said I wouldn’t go’: Exploring agency in the narratives of marriage by women from Yolmo, Nepal]" 東洋文化研究所紀要 152: 472-424(137-185). [In Japanese]

Sato, Seika (2009). "彼女との長い会話 あるネパール女性のライフ・ストーリー (pt. 1)[A long conversation with Ngima: the life story of a woman from Yolmo, Nepal (pt. 1)]." 帝京社会学第 22: 69-104. [In Japanese]
Sato, Seika (2010). "彼女との長い会話 あるネパール女性のライフ・ストーリー"  (pt. 2)[A long conversation with Ngima: the life story of a woman from Yolmo, Nepal (pt. 2)]. 帝京社会学第 23: 171-240. [In Japanese]
Sychenko, G.B. (2009). "In the place, where angels live (Musical ethnographic expedition in Nepal, 2007, part 1)." in Siberian ethnological expedition: Comparative research of the process of transformation of intonational cultures of Siberia and Nepal, pp. 104–125. Novosibirsk: NGK. [in Russian]
Sychenko, G.B. and A.V. Zolotukhina (2012). "Hyolmo of Nepal: Ritual, myth, music." in Pax Sonoris N. [In Russian]
Torri, Davide (2008). "Il sacro diffuso. Religione e pratica sciamanica presso l'etnia himalayana degli Yolmo." Scritture di Storia 5: 7-32. [in Italian]
Torri, Davide (2011). "Shamanic Traditions and Music among the Yolmos of Nepal." Musikè International Journal of Ethnomusicological Studies 5, III(1): 81-93. 
Torri, Davide (2013). "Between a rock and a hard place: Himalayanencounters with human and other-than-human opponents." Shamanism and violence: Power, repression and suffering in indigenous religious conflict. D. Riboli & D. Torri (eds.). Abingdon: Ashgate.
Torri, Davide (forthcoming). Il Lama e il Bombo. Sciamanismo e Buddhismo tra gli Hyolmo del Nepal. Rome: Sapienza. [In Italian]
Zolotukhina, A.V. (2011). "Rural ritual and secular traditions in the urban context: Music of Hyolmo (Kathmandu, Nepal)." in Musical urban culture as an artistic and social problem: Proceedings of the Scientific Conference (April, 2011), pp. 67–74. Novosibirsk: NGK. With G.B. Sychenko. [in Russian]
Zolotukhina, A.V. (2012). "Ritual Phurdok (pur-pa puja) and its musical features." in Music and time 1:32-36. [In Russian]

Indigenous peoples of Nepal
Ethnic groups in Nepal
Sino-Tibetan-speaking people
Himalayan peoples
Ethnic groups in Bhutan
Scheduled Tribes of West Bengal
Sikkim
Buddhist communities of Bhutan
Buddhist communities of Nepal